BMB or B.M.B. may mean:
 Bhartiya Mahila Bank, India's first bank exclusively for women, Headquarters in New Delhi
 Blind man's buff, a popular children's game
 Brian Michael Bendis, American comic book writer
 Boston–Montreal–Boston, BMB is a randonnée bicycle event of approximately 1200 km
 Beattie McGuinness Bungay, a British advertising agency
 Bad Movie Beatdown, a web show about bad films 
 Biochemistry and Molecular Biology, a department at the Johns Hopkins Bloomberg School of Public Health
 Bear Mountain Bridge, suspension bridge over the Hudson River in the U.S. state of New York
 Boston Marathon bombing
 Bone marrow biopsy
 Bumba Airport IATA code